Ian James Gemmell (born 6 April 1953) is a former English cricketer. Gemmell was a right-handed batsman who bowled right-arm fast-medium. He was born in Ashton-under-Lyne, Lancashire.

Gemmell made his debut for Cheshire in the 1978 Minor Counties Championship against the Somerset Second XI. Gemmell played Minor counties cricket for Cheshire from 1978 to 1983, including 48 Minor Counties Championship matches and two MCCA Knockout Trophy matches. In 1964, he made his List A debut for Minor Counties North in the 1979 Benson & Hedges Cup, playing two matches against Middlesex and Yorkshire. He later represented the Minor Counties cricket team in the 1981 and 1982 competitions, playing five matches for the team. His debut in List A cricket for Cheshire did not come until the 1981 NatWest Trophy when Cheshire played Hampshire. He played two further List A matches for Cheshire, in 1982 against Middlesex and in 1983 against Kent. In total he ten List A matches, scoring 59 runs at a batting average of 7.37, with a high score of 20*. With the ball he took 7 wickets at a bowling average of 45.71, with best figures of 2/58.

References

External links
Ian Gemmell at ESPNcricinfo
Ian Gemmell at CricketArchive

1953 births
Living people
Cricketers from Ashton-under-Lyne
English cricketers
Cheshire cricketers
Minor Counties cricketers